Berlebach Stativtechnik from Mulda, Saxony in Germany, is a manufacturer of Tripods and Monopods for Photography, Telescope and Surveying made from ash (Fraxinus excelsior).

History
The company was founded by Peter Otto Berlebach in 1898.In 1994 Berlebach had shown its products first time on the Photokina fare. Today Berlebach is a leading company for wood Tripods and is exporting to more than 40 nations. The main advantage of Berlebach-Tripods is the low Oscillation, which is especially important for Telephoto lenses.

Products

Photography tripods

Astro Tripods

EMC Tripods
Berlebach is producing special Tripods for Electromagnetic compatibility measurement purpose, which don’t contain any Metal.

References

External links

 
 Review of a current Report 332
 Discussion about Berlebach for a refractor
 Review of an older Report 3032
 Review of an older Report 8023
Photography equipment
Photography companies of Germany
Companies based in Saxony
German brands